Drňa is a village and municipality in the Rimavská Sobota District of the Banská Bystrica Region of southern Slovakia.

History
In historical records, the village was first mentioned in 1245 when it was founded (1246 Darna, 1380 Dranya, 1431 Darnia). In the 15th century it belonged to nobles Janosy. In the 16th century, it was attacked by the Turks and in 1566-67 it had to pay them a tribute. From 1938 to 1945, it belonged to Hungary.

Genealogical resources

The records for genealogical research are available at the state archive "Statny Archiv in Banska Bystrica, Slovakia"

 Roman Catholic church records (births/marriages/deaths): 1761-1896 (parish B)
 Reformated church records (births/marriages/deaths): 1769-1858 (parish B)

See also
 List of municipalities and towns in Slovakia

External links
https://web.archive.org/web/20071116010355/http://www.statistics.sk/mosmis/eng/run.html
http://www.e-obce.sk/obec/drna/drna.html
Surnames of living people in Rimavska Sobota

Villages and municipalities in Rimavská Sobota District